The term twin towers in architecture refers to two tall structures with nearly identical characteristics and similar height, usually constructed close to each other and part of a single complex. The charts below lists most twin and other multi-column structures with similar characteristics.

Twin buildings

Completed or topped-out buildings 

The following list includes only twin buildings that are continuously habitable.

Proposed, under construction, topped-out, destroyed, or cancelled

Buildings and structures with more than two identical columns

List by continent 
The following list shows the tallest completed twin buildings located in each continent:

See also 
 List of tallest buildings
 List of tallest structures

Notes 
 A.  By pinnacle height (height to tip of antenna, in this case)

References 

Twin buildings
Twin buildings
Lists of construction records